Steffi is a feminine given name, often a short form (hypocorism) of Stephanie or Stefanie.

Steffi is the name of:

Steffi Duna (1910-1992), Hungarian-born film actress born Erzébet Berindey
Steffi Götzelt (born 1960), East German retired rower
Steffi Graf (born 1969), German former tennis player
Steffi Jacob (born 1975), German skeleton racer
Steffi Jones (born 1972), German football manager and retired defender
Stefanie Koch (born 1981), German ski mountaineer
Steffi Kräker (born 1960), East German retired gymnast
Steffi Kriegerstein (born 1992), German canoeist
Steffi Martin (born 1962), East German former luger
Steffi Nerius (born 1972), German javelin thrower
Steffi Scherzer (born 1957), German ballet dancer, director and instructor
Steffi Sieger (born 1988), German luger
Steffi Van Wyk (born 1995), Namibian model and Miss Namibia 2015

Feminine given names
Hypocorisms
German feminine given names